Adavi may refer to:

Adavi, Kerala, a tourism place in Kerala
Adavi, Maharashtra, a village in Maharashtra, India
Adavi, Nigeria, a Local Government Area in Kogi State
Agyaat or Adavi, a 2009 Telugu movie
Adavi (film), a 2020 Tamil-language film